In music, Op. 232 stands for Opus number 232. Compositions that are assigned this number include:

 Albéniz – Chants d'Espagne
 Albéniz – Córdoba
 Albéniz – Oriental